John D. White (February 14, 1802 – September 22, 1845) was a prominent U.S. politician during the 1840s.

White was a native of Kentucky and practiced law there. White was elected to the Kentucky House of Representatives in 1832. He served as the speaker of the United States House of Representatives from 1841 to 1843, and was a member of the United States Congress from 1835 to 1845.

On April 23, 1844, White was involved in a physical confrontation on the House floor with Democratic Congressman George O. Rathbun of New York. White was delivering a speech in defense of Senator Henry Clay, the Whig nominee for President in that year's presidential election, and objected to a ruling from the Speaker denying him time to conclude his remarks. When Rathbun told White to be quiet, White confronted him and their disagreement lead to a fistfight between the two with dozens of their colleagues rushing to break up the fight. During the disturbance, an unknown visitor fired a pistol into the crowd, wounding a police officer. Both White and Rathbun subsequently apologized for their actions.

White was appointed judge of the nineteenth judicial district of Kentucky and served in that capacity from February 8, 1845, until his death in Richmond, Kentucky on September 22, 1845.

White's 1st cousin, Addison White, was a congressman from Kentucky at the same time representing the 6th District. Their shared nephew, John D. White, would also go on to represent Kentucky's 9th district in the late 1870s while their niece Laura Rogers White was one of the first 8 women to graduate from University of Michigan in 1874. He was also a cousin removed of Hugh Lawson White, and Brigadier General James White.

John White died by suicide on September 22, 1845, after it was discovered he had plagiarized one of the last speeches he gave in office from Aaron Burr. White is buried in the Frankfort Cemetery in Frankfort, Kentucky.

References

Biographical Directory of the United States Congress: WHITE, John

Speakers of the United States House of Representatives
Members of the Kentucky House of Representatives
Kentucky state court judges
1802 births
1845 deaths
Burials at Frankfort Cemetery
Kentucky Whigs
Whig Party members of the United States House of Representatives
National Republican Party members of the United States House of Representatives from Kentucky
19th-century American politicians
19th-century American judges